Beatnik is a simple stack-oriented esoteric programming language, by Cliff L. Biffle. A Beatnik program consists of any sequence of English words. Each word is assigned the score one would get for it in a Scrabble game. The value of the score determines what function is performed. Functions include pushing the score of the next word onto the stack, testing the stack and skipping forward or backward in the program and other stack operations.

Overview

Markup 
The interpreter reads the words in the poem, ignoring punctuation and whitespace and newlines. Some functions are one word, other functions have an argument (they are two-word functions). Two-word functions are described below in the form "5,n". This means both the word whose value is 5 and the next word (whose value is 'n') are read.

Here are the scrabble letter values, for reference.

Examples

Hello World 
A "Hello World" example in the Beatnik language.

 Soars, larkspurs, rains.
 Indistinctness.
 Mario snarl (nurses, natures, rules...) sensuously retries goal.
 Agribusinesses' costs par lain ropes (mopes) autos' cores.
 Tuner ambitiousness.
 Flit.
 Dour entombment.
 Legals' saner kinking lapse.
 Nests glint.
 Dread, tied futures, dourer usual tumor grunts alter atonal
   garb tries shouldered coins.
 Taste a vast lustiness.
 Stile stuns gad subgroup gram lanes.
 Draftee insurer road: cuckold blunt, strut sunnier.
 Rely enure pantheism: arty gain groups (genies, pan) titters, tattles, nears.
 Bluffer tapes?  Idle diatom stooge!
 Feted antes anklets ague?  Remit goiter gout!
 Doubtless teared toed alohas will dull gangs' aerials' tails' sluices;
 Gusset ends!  Gawkier halo!
 
 Enter abstruse rested loser beer guy louts.
 Curtain roams lasso weir lupus stunt.
 Truant bears animate talon.  Entire torte originally timer.
 Redo stilt gobs.
 
 Utter centaurs;
 Urgent stars;
 Usurers (dilute);
 Noses;
 Bones;
 Brig sonar graders;
 Utensil silts;
 Lazies.
 Fret arson veterinary rows.
 
 Atlas grunted: "Pates, slues, sulfuric manor liaising tines,
   trailers, rep... unfair!  Instant snots!"
 
 Sled rested until eatery fail.
 Ergs fortitude
   Indent spotter
 Euros enter egg.
 Curious tenures.
 Torus cutlasses.
 Sarong torso earns cruel lags it reeled.
 
 Engineer: "Erase handbag -- unite ratification!"
 
 oaring oaten donkeys unsold, surer rapid saltest tags
 BUTTERED TIBIA LUGS REWIRING TOILETS
 anion festers raring edit epilogues.
 DIRGE ROTOR.
 linnet oaring.
 GORE BOOTIES.
 Ironed goon lists tallest sublets --
 Riots,
 Raucous onset.
 
 Ignobly, runners' diet anguishes sunrise loner.
 Erode mob, slier switcher!
 Loaners stilt drudge pearl atoll, risking hats' ends.
 
 Rebind sitters.
 
 Toga epistles -- crud lard.  (Pager purse dons souls.)
 
 glob title a curio hired rites shed suds lade grease strut arctic revs toad
 unless idlers rind stilt region land GERMICIDES SULTANA GUTS gill siting leans
 nice spurs
 tests gloves
 roused asp
 
 Holes!  Moles!  (Sores!)
 Hygienists!  Scars!  (Asses!)
 Smells spell rares.
 
 Cubs instant sing in parse goodies.
 Rosin.  Unhelpful sisal acres.  Slope told.
 MALENESS PASTA LAB.  "Infirmary vine," rang illiterates (beans).
 Rosin sours, insults truss abalones, nailed rules, helical atlases.
 Dear remodeling stings mar rents.
 Sunless shiner orb (silly idol.)
 Clarity disses senna.
 Vagabonds sauted; sloes performed gelds.
 Alter post radial lip sectioning gums.
 Saint Towellings.
 Larger aeons telephone stolid char, pal!
 Boats Dean forsook, rosters, tunas, terrariums -- united, traced.
 Nude pagoda careens.

See also 

 List of esoteric programming languages

References

External links
 
 endforward beatnik.net A .net (MSIL) beatnik compiler
 A Javascript interpreter
 A Go (Golang) interpreter

Esoteric programming languages